Paul Allan (born 7 February 2000) is a Scottish professional footballer who plays as a midfielder for Dunfermline Athletic. Allan previously had loan spells with Stenhousemuir, Hill of Beath Hawthorn, Brechin City and Albion Rovers.

Career
Allan started his youth career at Inverkeithing Boys Club, before joining Dunfermline Athletic at the age of 10. He signed a two-year contract with the club in May 2017, and had spells on loan at Stenhousemuir – for whom he made three appearances – and Hill of Beath Hawthorn during the 2017–18 season.

He made his debut for Dunfermline Athletic on 14 August 2018 in a 2–1 victory over Inverness Caledonian Thistle in the Scottish Challenge Cup.

In September 2019, he joined Brechin City on loan until January 2020. In January 2020, the loan was extended until the end of the season. He appeared in 19 league matches for the club, scoring once.

In October 2020, Allan joined Scottish League Two side Albion Rovers on a season-long loan, with the loan being ended by his parent club in January.

References

2000 births
Living people
Scottish footballers
Association football defenders
Dunfermline Athletic F.C. players
Stenhousemuir F.C. players
Hill of Beath Hawthorn F.C. players
Brechin City F.C. players
Albion Rovers F.C. players
Scottish Professional Football League players